Patrick Lane (March 26, 1939 – March 7, 2019) was a Canadian poet. He had written in several other genres, including essays, short stories, and was the author of the novel Red Dog, Red Dog.

Biography
Born in Nelson, British Columbia, he attended high school in Vernon and had no further formal education. He first began writing poetry seriously in 1960. During his twenties, he held a series of difficult jobs in the logging industry in the northern part of the province—as a choker, truck driver, Industrial First Aid man, sawmill worker, salesman and so on. In 1965, he moved to Vancouver and began to connect with other poets of his generation.

Lane, Bill Bissett and Seymour Mayne founded the small-press publisher Very Stone House in 1966.

In 1968, Lane's first marriage ended and he moved to South America to dedicate himself completely to writing. When he returned, he remarried and established a home in the Okanagan Valley in 1972. In 1974 he and his wife moved to the Sunshine Coast.

After a second divorce in 1978, he became Writer-in-Residence at University of Manitoba, where he met fellow poet Lorna Crozier. Also in 1978, Lane won the Governor General's Award for his collection Poems, New and Selected.

Lane lived for many years with Crozier in Saanichton, British Columbia, where he tended a garden of  that has been featured on the television program Recreating Eden, and which he wrote about in the memoir There is a Season.

He participated in Dial-A-Poem Montreal from 1985 to 1987.

From 1986 to 1990, Lane taught creative writing and Canadian literature courses at the University of Saskatchewan in Saskatoon, Saskatchewan, and later taught at the University of Victoria in Victoria, British Columbia from 1991 to 2004. When he retired from formal teaching, he was still an adjunct professor at UVic and frequently led retreats and workshops for writers.  In 2007, he was awarded the fourth annual Lieutenant Governor's Award for Literary Excellence for his lifetime contribution to literature in British Columbia. His novel Red Dog, Red Dog appeared in 2008.

A recovering alcoholic and cocaine user, Lane wrote about his struggles with dependency in Addicted: Notes From the Belly of the Beast, which he co-edited with Crozier, and in There is a Season.

On November 21, 2014, Governor General David Johnston presented Patrick Lane with the Order of Canada, recognizing his more than 50 years of contribution to Canadian poetry and literature. His latest book "Washita", was nominated for the 2015 Governor General's Literary Award for poetry.

He had five children, three from his first marriage and two from his second. He was the brother of poet Red Lane. He lived the latter part of his life in the Victoria, BC area and died on March 7, 2019, aged 79 .

Bibliography
Letters from the Savage Mind – 1966
Separations – 1969
"Calgary City Jail" – 1969
"On the Street" – 1970
Mountain Oysters – 1971
The Sun Has Begun to Eat the Mountain – 1972
"Passing into Storm" – 1973
Beware the Months of Fire – 1974
"certs" – 1974
Unborn Things: South American Poems" – 1975
"Albino Pheasants" – 1977Poems, New and Selected – 1978 (winner of the 1978 Governor General's Award)No Longer Two People – 1979 (with Lorna Crozier)The Measure – 1980Old Mother – 1982Woman in the Dust – 1983A Linen Crow, A Caftan Magpie – 1984Selected Poems – 1987Milford and Me – 1989Winter – 1989 (nominated for a Governor General's Award)Mortal Remains – 1991 (nominated for a Governor General's Award)How Do You Spell Beautiful? And Other Stories – 1992
"Praise" – 1993Too Spare, Too Fierce – 1995 (winner of the Dorothy Livesay Poetry Prize)Selected Poems – 1997The Bare Plum of Winter Rain – 2000 (nominated for the Dorothy Livesay Poetry Prize)There is a Season – 2004 (nominated for the Hubert Evans Non-Fiction Prize)
published in the US as What the Stones Remember: A Life Rediscovered 2004 (nominated for Barnes & Noble Discover Great New Writers Award for Non-fiction)Go Leaving Strange – 2005 – (nominated for the Dorothy Livesay Poetry Prize)Red Dog, Red Dog – 2008Witness: Selected Poems 1962–2010 – 2010The Collected Poems of Patrick Lane – 2011Washita – 2014Deep River Night - 2018

Edited with Lorna CrozierBreathing Fire – 1995Addicted: Notes from the Belly of the Beast – 2001Breathing Fire 2'' – 2004

References

External links
 Archives of Patrick Lane (Patric Lane fonds, R16154) are held at Library and Archives Canada

1939 births
2019 deaths
20th-century Canadian poets
20th-century Canadian male writers
Canadian male poets
Canadian literary critics
Canadian male novelists
Canadian non-fiction writers
Governor General's Award-winning poets
Academic staff of the University of Victoria
Writers from British Columbia
People from Nelson, British Columbia
Canadian male non-fiction writers